State governments of Mexico are those sovereign governments formed in each Mexican state.

Structured in accordance with the constitution of each state, state governments in Mexico are modeled on the federal system, with three branches of government — executive, legislative, and judicial, and are formed based on the congressional system.  Mexico's central federal government, on the other hand, represents the United Mexican States before international bodies such as the United Nations.

The executive power is exercised by the executive branch, which is headed by the state's governor, advised by a cabinet of Secretaries that are independent of the legislature. Legislative power is vested upon the congress of the state. Judicial power is exercised by the various local tribunals (Ministerio de Justicia) and the state's Supreme Court of Justice.

State governments 
Mexico is a federation of 31 free and sovereign states. All constituent states of the federation must have a republican form of government based on a congressional system. The executive power is vested upon a governor elected by first-past-the-post plurality without the possibility of re-election. The legislative power is vested upon a unicameral Congress whose composition is determined by the constitutions of each state, but must include first-past-the-post and proportional representation deputies & they must not be re-elected for the next immediate term. The judicial power is vested upon the tribunals that each state establishes in its constitution. The re-election of the ministers of justice is a prerogative established by each constituent state.

All states are both independent & autonomous in their internal administration. The federal government cannot intervene in any particular state's affairs unless there is a full cessation of government powers and through previous study, recommendation and/or approval of the Congress of the Union. The states cannot make an alliance with any foreign power or with any other state. They cannot unilaterally declare war against a foreign nation unless their territory is invaded & cannot wait for the Congress of the Union to issue a declaration of war.

Municipal governments 

All states are divided into municipalities, the smallest autonomous political entity in Mexico.  Municipalities are governed through a municipal council (ayuntamiento) headed by a mayor or municipal president (presidente municipal) whose work is supported by a predetermined number of regents (regidores) and trustees (síndicos), according to the constitutions of the states they are part of. Since 1917 there are no intermediate entities or authorities between municipalities and the state governments. Members of the municipal councils cannot be reelected for the next immediate term. Autonomous municipalities are constitutionally known as "free municipalities" (municipios libres).

Municipalities are responsible for public services (such as water and sewage), street lighting, public safety, traffic, supervision of slaughterhouses and the cleaning and maintenance of public parks, gardens and cemeteries, as well as in zoning and urban planning. They may also assist the state and federal governments in education, emergency fire and medical services, environmental protection and maintenance of monuments and historical landmarks. As of 1983, they can collect property taxes and user fees although more funds are obtained from the state and federal governments than from their own collection efforts.

Elections 
The elections in each state are done at different times, depending on the state, and aren't necessarily held at the same time with the federal elections. Currently, the Revolutionary Institutional Party (PRI) is the 1st political force in the Congress of the Union, in terms of number of seats, and the first political force in terms of the number of states governed by it. As of 2021[3] :

 PRI governs 4 states : Coahuila, Hidalgo, México, Oaxaca,
 PAN governs 8 states: Aguascalientes, Chihuahua, Durango, Guanajuato, Querétaro, Quintana Roo, Tamaulipas and Yucatán
 PVEM governs a state: San Luis Potosí
 MC governs 2 states: Jalisco and Nuevo León
 Morena governs the remaining 17 states

Historical political development

Specific jurisdictions

México

The State of Mexico is governed according to the Constitution of the State of Mexico and the law of the State of Mexico. The previous constitutions of 1827, 1861, and 1870 were replaced in 1917. The government is composed of legislative, executive, and judicial branches. The legislative branch is composed of the Mexico State Legislature; the executive branch is composed of the Governor, Cabinet, and Public Prosecutor; and the judicial branch is composed of the Judicial Council, High Court of Justice, and inferior courts.

Yucatán

The Constitution of Yucatán provides that the government of Yucatán, like the government of every other state in Mexico, consists of three powers: the executive, the legislative and the judiciary. Executive power rests in the governor of Yucatán, who is directly elected by the citizens, using a secret ballot, to a six-year term with no possibility of reelection.  Legislative power rests in the Congress of Yucatán which is a unicameral legislature composed of 25 deputies. Judicial power is invested in the Superior Court of Justice of Yucatán.

The Federal District 

Mexico City does not belong to any state in particular, but to the federation, being the capital of the country and seat of the powers of the Union. As such, it is constituted as a Federal District, ultimately administered by the Powers of the Union. Nonetheless, since the late 1990s some level of autonomy and local jurisdictional power have been gradually vested on it. The executive power is vested upon a head of government now elected by first-past-the-post plurality. The legislative power is vested upon a unicameral Legislative Assembly. The judicial power is exercised by the Supreme Tribunal of Justice and the Judiciary Council.

The Federal District is divided into delegaciones or boroughs. Though not fully equivalent to a municipality in that they do not have regulatory powers, they have gained limited autonomy in recent years, and the representatives to the head of government are now elected by the citizens as well.

References and notes

See also

 
Administrative division
Federal government of Mexico
List of Latin American subnational entities by HDI
List of Mexican state demonyms
List of Mexican state governors
List of Mexican states by area
List of Mexican states by HDI
List of Mexican states by population
Mexican state name etymologies
Political divisions of Mexico
Politics of Mexico
Ranked list of Mexican states
Territorial evolution of Mexico

External links 
 Presidency of the United Mexican States
 Congress of the Union
 Supreme Court of Justice of the Nation
 Mexican Council for Economic and Social Development

State